The fifth season of So You Think You Can Dance, a Dutch/Belgian televised dance competition, aired in the fall of 2012 on networks RTL5 (Netherlands) and vtm (Belgium).   Judges Dan Karaty, Euvgenia Parakhina and Jan Kooijman all returned as permanent members of the judge's panel. Departing judge Marco Gerrits was replaced by choreographer Ish Ait Hamou. An Lemmens and Dennis Weening returned in their roles as co-hosts.   On December 9, hip-hop dancer Frederic de Smet was announced as the winner of the competition and awarded a choice of dance school scholarship and €25,000.

Selection process

Open Auditions
The announcement that So You Think You Can Dance had been picked up for a fifth season was made during the fourth season finale on  November 27, 2011, but registration of contestants did not begin until several months later. As with season four, open auditions were held at the Royal Theatre Carré in Amsterdam on July 8 and 9 and in the BOZAR in Brussels on July 15 and 16. As with previous seasons, the open auditions represented the initial assessment of contestants before the more extensive workshops of the show's “Bootcamp” phase; however, unlike in previous seasons, the judges awarded special places to four different contestants (Vita Boers, Sarah Mancini, Remy Vetter and Niels van den Heuvel), which allowed them to proceed immediately to the foreign phase of the bootcamp, skipping the initial workshops at the “ArtEz” Arnhem studios.

Bootcamp
The initial workshops of the Bootcamp phase took place at ArtEZ dance studious in Arnhem during July 20–22. Just over 100 contestants participated after being selected during the open auditions. Day one featured workshops for four dance styles – hip-hop, Latin, modern, and jazz – the results of which more than halved the number of contestants to 43. One dancer, Vivian Gomez Cardoso, impressed the judges to such a degree during this first day that she was immediately awarded a spot in the foreign component of the Bootcamp; Cardoso would go on to take second place for the season. During the second day, couples were formed and given a piece of music from any of a number of genres, around which they were required to design a short routine. Based on these performances, the judges selected half of the remaining dancers (21, plus the additional five already awarded places) to proceed to the foreign phase of the Bootcamp, held in New York City, for season 5.

Once in New York, the remaining dancers were granted the choice of a modern or hip-hop workshop, though they were given no details as to where and under whom these would take place until after they made their choice. Those who chose hip-hop were trained by hip-hop choreographer “Dixter” in the Bronx, whereas those who chose modern went to the prestigious Alvin Ailey American Dance Theater in Manhattan. These workshops were immediately followed by a challenge to develop group choreography within these two styles, with a total of four performances (two each for hip-hop and modern); a handful of contestants were eliminated from competition immediately after. These eliminations were followed by the contestants attending an exclusive closed-doors rehearsal of the musical Chicago, which became an introduction to the next challenge – the performance of an iconic and challenging piece of choreography from that show, dancing in pairs as back-up to actress/dancer Dylis Croman in the lead role of Roxie Hart. To further challenge the dancers, they were told neither their partner nor their relative role in the choreography until just before their performances.  After this final challenge, and taking into account past performances, the judges selected 18 dancers from the remaining contestants to move on and participate in the Live Shows.

Top 18 contestants

Male Contestants

Female Contestants

 Meeusen replaced original Top 18 dancer Isabel Bérénos, who voluntarily withdrew from the competition.

Live shows

Eliminations Table

Live Show 1 (21 October 2012)

Show 1 Results
Group Choreography: Top 18: "Bangarang" - Skrillex featuring Sirah (Hip Hop Contemporary, Choreographer: Roy Julen)
Dance For Your Life solos:

Live Show 2 (28 October 2012)

Show 2 Results
'Group Choreography: Top 16: 'Euphoria' - Loreen (Modern, Choreographer: Roy Julen)
Dance For Your Life solos:

Live Show 3 (4 November 2012)

Show 3 Results
'Group Choreography: Top 14: "Niggas in Paris" - Jay-Z and Kanye West (Hip-hop, Choreographer: Roy Julen)
Dance For Your Life solos:

Live Show 4 (11 November 2012)

Show 4 Results
'Group Choreography: Top 12: "Mirror" - Lil Wayne featuring Bruno Mars (Hip-hop, Choreographer: Roy Julen)
Dance For Your Life solos:

Live Show 5 (18 November 2012)

Show 5 Results
'Group Choreography: Top 10: 'Turn Around' - Conor Maynard featuring Ne-Yo (Hip-hop, Choreographer: Roy Julen)
Solos:

Live Show 6 (25 November 2012)

Show 6 Results
'Group Choreography: Top 8: "Come Together" - Kane (Hip-hop, Choreographer: Roy Julen)
Solos:

Live Show 7 (2 December 2012)

Show 7 Results
'Group Choreography: Top 6: "Beneath Your Beautiful" - Labrinth featuring Emeli Sande (Hip-hop, Choreographer: Roy Julen)
 'Eliminated:Davinia Janssens **
Delano ** Spenrath

Finale (9 December 2012)
'Group Choreography: Top 18: "Bangarang" - Skrillex featuring Sirah (Hip Hop, Choreographer: Roy Julen)Final Results'Group Choreography: The 14 dropouts: "All of the Lights" - Kanye West featuring Rihanna (Hip Hop, Choreographer: Roy Julen)
 'EliminatedDenden Karadeniz **Solos:'' 'Battle: 'Runner-up
Vivian Cardoso Gomez  'Winner:'''
 Frederic De Smet

Theater tour

Tour Dates

 : These dates have two shows. One at 5:00 PM and at 8:30 PM.

External links
 Belgian official website: So You Think You Can Dance 
 Dutch official website: So You Think You Can Dance

References

Season 05